Pig Iron Theatre Company is a multidisciplinary ensemble based in Philadelphia, Pennsylvania.  The company has created over 40 original works over the past 26 years, performed both locally and internationally. Their individual works have been inspired by history and biography, rock music, American kitsch culture, scientific research and our relationship to our geologic time.  They have toured to festivals and theaters in places such as England, Scotland, Poland, Lithuania, Brazil, Ireland, Japan, Italy, Romania and Germany, among many others.

About 

The mission of the company is to "expand what is possible in performance by creating unusual and exuberant ensemble-devised works; by training the next generation of daring, innovative theatre artists; and by consistently asking the hardest questions, both in our art and in its relation to the world around us."

This mission statement is realized through the unique creation process that is used. Using improvisation, company discussion, and a development period of over a year, the projects are all unique and distinct.  Shows range from a rock-n-roll cabaret piece emceed by James Joyce’s institutionalized daughter (The Lucia Joyce Cabaret) to an interactive “simulated economic environment” with a cast of 30 (Pay Up).

Pig Iron is made up of three artistic directors, four company members, a small administrative staff, and a board of directors.  The company has received numerous awards for their work, including nine Barrymore awards and an OBIE Award (2004-Hell Meets Henry Halfway). In 2010 co-artistic directors Gabriel Quinn Bauriedel, Dan Rothenberg, and Dito van Reigersberg won a Fellow award granted by United States Artists.

The company has toured both locally and internationally, including festivals in Poland, Lithuania, Scotland, Ireland, Romania, Brazil, Italy, Ukraine, and England.  In addition to their main shows, Pig Iron also hosts a cabaret-style show as a fundraiser for the company each year.

Pig Iron embarked on a major new endeavor in 2011 with the launch of the Pig Iron School for Advanced Performance Training (APT) - a two-year post-graduate program for performers and directors rooted in Pig Iron’s own methods of physical and ensemble-based theatre.

In 2011, Pig Iron was awarded the American Theatre Wing's National Theatre Company Grant.

Productions 
 The Odyssey (1995)
 Dig or Fly (1996)
 Cafeteria (1997)
 Poet in New York (1997)
 The Impossible Play (1998)
 Trip to the Moon (1998)
 Gentleman Volunteers (1998)
 The Tragedy of Joan of Arc (1998)
 The Snow Queen (1999)
 Newborn Things (1999)
 Mission to Mercury (2000)
 Shut Eye (2001)
 Anodyne (2001)
 Flop (2002)
 She Who Makes the Moon (2002)
 James Joyce Is Dead And So Is Paris: The Lucia Joyce Cabaret (2003)
 Hell Meets Henry Halfway (2004)
 Pay Up (2005)
 Love Unpunished (2006)
 Chekhov Lizardbrain (2007)
 Isabella (2007)
 365 Days/365 Plays (2007)
 Come to My Awesome Fiesta, It's Going to be Awesome, Okay? (2008)
 Sweet By & By (2008)
 Welcome to Yuba City (2009)
 Cankerblossom (2010)
 Twelfth Night (2011)
 Zero Cost House (2012)
 99 Breakups (2014)
 I Promised Myself to Live Faster (2015)
 Gentleman Volunteers (2015)
 Swamp is On (2015)
 A Period of Animate Existence (2017)
 Fire Burns Hot! (2017)
 The Caregivers (2018)
 A Hard time (2019)
 Superterranean (2019)
 Zero Cost House (For Zoom) (2020)

Current Company Members 
 Gabriel Quinn Bauriedel (Artistic Director)
 Dito van Reigersberg (Artistic Director)
 Dan Rothenberg (Artistic Director)
 Cassandra Friend
 Sarah Sanford
 Geoff Sobelle
 James Sugg
 Alex Torra

References

External links 
 Pig Iron Theatre Company Website
 Pig Iron School For Advanced Performance Training

Theatre companies in Philadelphia
Pew Fellows in the Arts